The Weissfluh is a mountain of the Plessur Alps, located above Davos in the canton of Graubünden. It is part of a ski area and the summit is served by a cable car from the Weissfluhjoch.

See also
List of most isolated mountains of Switzerland
List of mountains of Switzerland accessible by public transport

References

External links
 Weissfluh on Hikr

Mountains of the Alps
Mountains of Switzerland
Mountains of Graubünden
Two-thousanders of Switzerland